Dilan Prašović (born 25 December 1994) is a Montenegrin professional boxer who challenged for the WBO cruiserweight title in 2021.

Professional career
After over 100 fights in the amateur ranks, Prašović made his professional debut on 25 October 2014, beating Aleksandar Petrović on points in Budva. After a 7–0 start, he earned his first title shot on 13 April 2018, stopping Máté Kristóf in the second round to claim the vacant WBO Youth cruiserweight title. He retained once – a first-round knockout (KO) of Angelo Venjakob less than two months later.

He entered the top ten of the WBO rankings for the first time in April 2019 after a second-round technical knockout (TKO) victory over Juan Ezequiel Basualdo that moved him to 11–0. He ended the year with two more wins and a #3 spot in the rankings. In January 2020, the WBO ordered a final eliminator between Prašović and the #4 ranked cruiserweight Edin Puhalo, which Prašović won convincingly on 23 October to become world title challenger.

Professional boxing record

Personal life
In February 2020 he was honored by his hometown of Herceg Novi for his sporting achievements in the past year.

References

External links
 

Living people
1994 births
Montenegrin male boxers
Cruiserweight boxers
People from Kotor
People from Herceg Novi